Off the Hook may refer to:

Music
 Off the Hook (compilation album), in the Now That's What I Call Music! series, 2002
 Off the Hook (Xscape album), 1995
 "Off the Hook" (Hardwell and Armin van Buuren song), 2015
 "Off the Hook" (Jody Watley song), 1998
 "Off the Hook", a song by CSS from Cansei de Ser Sexy, 2005
 "Off the Hook", a song by the Rolling Stones from The Rolling Stones No. 2, 1965

Television
 Off the Hook (TV series), a 2009 British sitcom
 Off the Hook: Extreme Catches, a 2012 American reality series
 "Off the Hook" (Arrested Development), an episode
 "Off the Hook" (The Closer), an episode
 "Off the Hook" (Happy Tree Friends), an episode
 "Off the Hook" (The Real Housewives of Atlanta), an episode

Other uses 
 Off the Hook (radio program), an American hacker-oriented talk program
 Off the Hook, Pearl and Marina, a fictional pop duo in the Splatoon video game series